In Control may refer to:
 In Control, a 1989 album by Heavens Gate
 In Control (EliZe album)), 2006 album
 In Control (US5 album), 2006 album
 In Control (Kary Ng album), 2007 album
 In Control (Nemesea album), 2007 album
 In Control (The Americans), the fourth episode of the first season of the television series The Americans
 "In Control (Baker Boy song)", 2019 song by Baker Boy
 "In Control", the first English-language song of pop-folk singer Preslava
 "In Control", a song by YoungBoy Never Broke Again from his 2019 album AI Youngboy 2